No. 171 Squadron RAF was a Royal Air Force Squadron that was a coastal reconnaissance and radio countermeasures unit in World War II.

History

Formation in World War II
The squadron formed on 15 June 1942 at Gatwick and equipped with 
Tomahawk and then Mustang aircraft, it was disbanded in December 1942 and then reformed on 8 September 1944 at North Creake, equipped with Stirling III and then Halifax Radio Countermeasures aircraft. It finally disbanded on 27 July 1945.

Aircraft operated

References

External links
 History of No.'s 171–175 Squadrons at RAF Web
 171 Squadron history on the official RAF website

171
Military units and formations established in 1942